Maria Plagiannakou (born ) is a retired Greek female volleyball player. She was part of the Greece women's national volleyball team. She won the silver medal at the 2005 Mediterranean Games. She played most notably for Olympiacos.

References

External links
profile at fivb
profile at bvbinfo.com

1978 births
Living people
Greek women's volleyball players
Olympiacos Women's Volleyball players
Place of birth missing (living people)
Mediterranean Games silver medalists for Greece
Mediterranean Games medalists in volleyball
Competitors at the 2005 Mediterranean Games
21st-century Greek women